The 1960 Long Beach State 49ers football team represented Long Beach State College—now known as California State University, Long Beach—as a member of the California Collegiate Athletic Association (CCAA) during the 1960 NCAA College Division football season. Led by third-year head coach Don Reed, the 49ers compiled an overall record of 5–3–1 with a mark of 3–1–1 in conference play, placing second in the CCAA. The team played home games at Veterans Memorial Stadium adjacent to the campus of Long Beach City College in Long Beach, California.

Schedule

References

Long Beach State
Long Beach State 49ers football seasons
Long Beach State 49ers football